Midasuno were a Welsh four-piece alternative rock band from South Wales. The band toured the United Kingdom and recorded three singles, an EP and three albums. The band are the subject of the road diary "Dial M For Merthyr" by the Welsh author Rachel Trezise.

Since splitting, Scott Andrews is now a member of Exit International while Chris Morgan formed Stay Voiceless after his subsequent band Accident Music split. Gavin Jessop & Matt Riste have been involved in other projects including the short lived All The Damn Vampires.

History

Formation and debut
In 2000, school friends Scott Andrews, Gavin Jessop, Matt Rise, Mike Cloke, and Steven Hopkins decided to form a band, originally known as Opium (not to be confused with the Merthyr-based band of the same name). Mike Cloke then left the band and songs such as an Art of fear and Lacerate/Break were written during this time. After a name change demo was recorded at Frontline Studios, Caerphilly, South Wales which won the band the opportunity to play the UK showcase that is In the City, Manchester.

The band's chaotic live shows created a buzz on the UK music scene, and after winning 'best unsigned act' at the 2002 Welsh Music Awards (beating off competition from bands such as Funeral for a Friend and Jarcrew), the band then planned releasing their debut single through Cardiff's indie record label, Cascade. The band then recorded the double A side single featuring the above-mentioned songs at Frontline, Caerphilly with Stuart Richardson (Lostprophets) and at Monnow Valley, Monmouthshire, with record producer Greg Haver. The strictly limited edition single was released later that year.

When Bulls Play God
Signed to Worcester's Lockjaw Records by the end of 2002, the band then recorded the mini-album "When Bulls Play God" at Waiting Room Studios, Mid Wales.  The album was recorded in under two weeks and a relentless UK tour schedule was then booked to promote the release.  The album was a month late coming out, and received rave reviews from the rock press including Rocksound, Metal Hammer, and Kerrang! magazine.

The band set out on tours with bands such as Hondo Maclean, Monkey Boy and Colour of Fire. Due to unknown reasons, the relationship between the label and the band deteriorated, and soon saw both the departure of the band from the label, and of Steven from the band. He was replaced by Christopher Morgan, guitarist of local band The UCA Chapter, who was a friend of Scott and Matt and fan of the band. The band then set off on a headlining UK tour just days after the completed line-up. It was on this tour that it was decided to enrol long term friend Lyndon Jones into the band to trigger samples and play synthesiser to thicken out the band's sound.

Til Death Do Us Party
After touring relentlessly the band then took some time out to write and record their debut album with producer Nick Loyd who had previously engineered some demo material for the band at Strongbox Studio in Penarth. Several songs were written in these sessions including A Machine; the rhythm thief, and other working titles such as Body like Christmas-head like Halloween, and the recording process was covered heavily by Rocksound Magazine.

Due to technical difficulties and personal strains the album took longer to materialise, initially titled The curse of Midasuno, the band decided to release the best of the tracks from the sessions as a mini-album "Til Death Do Us Party" which the band released in 2006 after signing a deal with Bristol-based label Sugar Shack Records. The band then returned to the road where they carved their niche in the British rock scene.

The band announced they will play one final show with the original line up at Cardiff's Millennium music hall on 4 December 2010, before closing the door on Midasuno forever.

Discography
 "The Art of Fear" (2002) (single)
1. "Art of Fear"
2. "Lacerate" / "Break"
 When Bulls Play God (2003) (studio album)
1. Start a riot
2. Samuel L.
3. Cut Ribbons
4. Face Down
5. Tear
6. Hypocrite
 Til Death Do Us Party (2006) (studio album)
1. A Machine; The Rhythm Thief
2. The Law Of Tooth And Fang
3. Taste the Virus
4. Shock, Horror
5. Sirens
 "Don't Drive (Faster than Your Angel Can Fly)" (2007) (single)
Songs in the key of F**k (2007) (studio album)
1. Sister Temptation
2. Don't Drive (Faster than your angel can fly)
3. Decent Assault
4. A Machine; The Rhythm Thief
5. 1997
6. The law of tooth and fang
7. Reactions
8. Sirens
9. The Continental Length
10. Sleepwalkers
 "Sister Temptation" (2008) (single)
1. Sister Temptation
2. Taste The Virus (Live @ BBC)
3. Reactions (Live @ BBC)
 Unreleased / Rare
1. Standstill
2. Bring Me The Heads
3. Come2Blows

References

Further reading
 Dial M for Merthyr: On Tour with Midasuno. Rachel Trezise - Published by Parthian 1 June 2007''
 The Guardian
 WalesOnline
 BBC article
 the BBC

External links
 Band biography located at their Myspace page
 BBC Wales band profile page
 Rock Sound

Welsh rock music groups
British post-hardcore musical groups
Musical groups established in 2000
People from Merthyr Tydfil